The 1993 Texas A&M Aggies football team  represented Texas A&M University in the 1993 NCAA Division I-A football season.  The Aggies completed the season with a 10–2 record overall and a Southwest Conference mark of 7–0.

Schedule

Roster
QB Corey Pulig

Game summaries

LSU

Oklahoma

Missouri

Texas Tech

Houston

Baylor

Rice

SMU

Louisville

TCU

Texas

Notre Dame

References

Texas AandM
Texas A&M Aggies football seasons
Southwest Conference football champion seasons
Texas AandM Aggies football